Concert Tour 2011 "Innovation" is a live video by Japanese duo Pink Lady. Recorded live at the Tokyo International Forum Hall A in Marunouchi, Tokyo on September 19, 2011, the video was released on December 28, 2011, by Victor Entertainment on DVD format. The video highlights the final show of the duo's comeback tour after declaring:  on September 1, 2010.

Track listing 
All lyrics are written by Yū Aku, except where indicated; all music is composed by Shunichi Tokura, except where indicated.

Personnel 
 Mie and Keiko Masuda – vocals
 Tommy G – manipulator
 Jun Asahi – keyboards
 Kenta Harada – guitar
 Teppei Kawasaki – bass
 Yukihiro Matsumoto – drums

References

External links 
 

2011 live albums
2011 video albums
Pink Lady (band) live albums
Japanese-language live albums
Live video albums
Victor Entertainment live albums